Machairophora fulvipuncta is a moth of the subfamily Arctiinae. It was described by George Hampson in 1893 from the Maskeliya area in Sri Lanka.

Description
Its wingspan is about 20 mm. In the male, the head, collar and tegula are orange yellow. Its thorax is dark brownish with a few orange scales. Abdomen and wings are very dark brown. Forewings with a dusky-yellow patch at the center of the inner margin. The female is wingless.

References

Lithosiini
Moths described in 1893